John Charles Thomas (born 22 September 1932) is an English former professional footballer who played in the Football League for Barnsley, Chesterfield and Mansfield Town.

References

1932 births
Living people
English footballers
Association football defenders
English Football League players
Wolverhampton Wanderers F.C. players
Barnsley F.C. players
Mansfield Town F.C. players
Chesterfield F.C. players